Anticoli may refer to:

 Anticoli Corrado, municipality in the Metropolitan City of Rome in the Italian region Latium
 Anticoli di Campagna, old name of Fiuggi